Prisoners of the Pines is a 1918 American silent drama film directed by Ernest C. Warde and starring J. Warren Kerrigan, Lois Wilson and Walter Perry.

Cast
 J. Warren Kerrigan as Hillaire Latour
 Lois Wilson as Rosalie Dufresne
 Walter Perry as 'Spud' Lafferty
 Claire Du Brey as Louise

References

Bibliography
 Rainey, Buck. Sweethearts of the Sage: Biographies and Filmographies of 258 actresses appearing in Western movies. McFarland & Company, 1992.

External links
 

1918 films
1918 drama films
1910s English-language films
American silent feature films
Silent American drama films
American black-and-white films
Films directed by Ernest C. Warde
Films distributed by W. W. Hodkinson Corporation
1910s American films